Jean-Pierre Burny (born 12 November 1944) is a Belgian sprint canoer who competed from the late 1960s to the mid-1970s. He won two medals at the ICF Canoe Sprint World Championships with a silver (K-2 500 m: 1971) and a bronze (K-1 500 m: 1970).

Burny also competed in three Summer Olympics in 1968–1976 with the best result of fourth place in the K-1 1000 m event in 1972.

References

1944 births
Belgian male canoeists
Canoeists at the 1968 Summer Olympics
Canoeists at the 1972 Summer Olympics
Canoeists at the 1976 Summer Olympics
Living people
Olympic canoeists of Belgium
ICF Canoe Sprint World Championships medalists in kayak
People from Mont-Saint-Guibert
Sportspeople from Walloon Brabant
20th-century Belgian people